The 2007–08 Premier Reserve League season is the ninth since its establishment. The events in the senior leagues during the 2006–07 season saw Watford, Charlton Athletic and Sheffield United all relegated and replaced by the promoted teams Birmingham City, Derby County and Sunderland.

Northern Champions Liverpool beat Southern Champions Aston Villa 3–0 in the Premier Reserve League Play-off Final and were crowned the National Champions.

Final league tables

Premier Reserve League North

Premier Reserve League South 

Pld = Matches played; W = Matches won; D = Matches drawn; L = Matches lost; GD = Goal difference; Pts = PointsC = Champions

Play-off Final

Relegated and Promoted teams 
These three teams were relegated from the Premier Reserve League at the end of this season:
 Derby County (South)
 Birmingham City (South)
 Reading (South)
These three teams will promote to the Premier Reserve League at the start of next season:
 West Bromwich Albion (South)
 Stoke City (South)
 Hull City (North)

Top scorers

Premier Reserve League North

Premier Reserve League South

See also 
 2007–08 in English football
 2007–08 Premier League
 2007–08 Premier Academy League

External links 
 Barclays Premier Reserve League Bulletin

Premier Reserve League
Premier Reserve League, 2007-08
Reserve